Koedange (Luxembourgish: Kéideng) is a section of the Luxembourgish commune of Fischbach located in Luxembourg District and Mersch canton. 

Fischbach, Mersch